The Best American Short Stories 2016, a volume in the Best American Short Stories series, was edited by Heidi Pitlor and by guest editor Junot Díaz.

Short Stories included

References

Fiction anthologies
Short Stories 2016
2016 anthologies
Houghton Mifflin books